Ambrose University is a private Christian liberal arts university located in Calgary, Alberta, Canada. It provides undergraduate and graduate level education for pastoral ministry, as well as undergraduate level education in select liberal arts and science degrees, including BEd, BA, BSc, BBA, BTh, MA, MCS, MTh and MDiv. The Graduate School of Theology also offers a Chinese Program (TSC - Theological Studies in Chinese). 

It was formed in 2007, when Alliance University College and Nazarene University College merged, and named in honor of Saint Ambrose. 

It is an affiliate of the Council for Christian Colleges and Universities.

History
Ambrose University is the product of similar educational journeys began in the second half of the twentieth century.

The Christian and Missionary Alliance established the Canadian Bible Institute in Regina, Saskatchewan, in 1941. It was established under the founding leadership of Gordon Skitch, superintendent of the Western Canadian District of the Christian and Missionary Alliance (C&MA), Willis Brooks, pastor of the Regina Alliance Tabernacle and well-known radio pastor, and George Blackett, who had served as the principal of Winnipeg Bible Institute and became the first principal, then president, of the institute.  In 1949, it was recognized by Saskatchewan and renamed Western Canadian Bible Institute (WCBI). It was renamed again in 1957 as the Canadian Bible College (CBC) of the Christian and Missionary Alliance (C&MA) and, in the 1960s, became associated with the University of Regina. Canadian Theological College (CTC) was established in 1970 as a graduate sister school to CBC, and was renamed Canadian Theological Seminary (CTS) in 1982.

Similarly but independently, the Calgary Bible Institute was first established in 1921 in the basement of the Calgary First Church of the Nazarene. In 1927, the school relocated to Red Deer, where it became known as Alberta School of Evangelism, and then Northern Bible College (NBC) with the construction of a new campus. In 1940, it was renamed again as Canadian Nazarene College (CNC) as it began offering theology degrees. In 1960, CNC moved to Winnipeg and was established as the official Canadian university college for the Church of the Nazarene.

Dr. Riley Coulter, President of CNC, determined that Manitoba would not accredit private institutions of higher education in the liberal arts and sciences. CNC thus moved back to its first home, Calgary, in 1995, became an accredited university college in 1999, and changed its name to Nazarene University College (NUC). Dr. George Durance, President of CBC/CTS, came to similar realizations regarding the accreditation status of his school in Saskatchewan and, in 2000, CBC/CTS made a similar decision. In 2003, CBC/CTS officially relocated to join NUC on the same campus, received accreditation in 2004, and changed its name to Alliance University College (AUC). AUC and NUC maintained a close relationship and were often referred to as Alliance University College-Nazarene University College (AUC-NUC), though the two granted degrees independently until 2007.

In 2007, Alliance University College and Nazarene University College became a single entity, known as Ambrose University College, in honour of Ambrose. A new campus opened in west Calgary in November 2008. In 2012 Gordon T. Smith was named president.

In 2014, Premier and Minister of Innovation and Advanced Education Dave Hancock approved the change of name to Ambrose University, dropping the word "College" to better reflect the nature of the institution.

Affiliation
Ambrose is the official Canadian school of both the Church of the Nazarene and The Christian and Missionary Alliance. It is one of 10 colleges and universities affiliated with the Church of the Nazarene in North America and one of 8 colleges and universities affiliated with The Christian and Missionary Alliance. In terms of its affiliation with the Nazarene church, AUC (formerly Canadian Nazarene University College) is the college for the Canada Region.

Academics
Ambrose University provides undergraduate education and graduate-level education for pastoral ministry, as well as undergraduate level education in select liberal arts and science degrees. In 2021 the School of Business at Ambrose University was officially launched as a more formalized Bachelor of Business Administration program school within the university, where before it was run under the liberal arts department. The School of Business has streams business majors can specialize in: marketing, accounting, data analytics, and Human Resources (HR).

Ambrose'mission is to "produce graduates who are consciously and actively Christian in all aspects of life," and to "serve the church by providing excellent preparation for pastoral ministry." 

Ambrose is accredited by the Association of Theological Schools in the United States and Canada to offer its Seminary degrees. The university is also accredited by the Association for Biblical Higher Education to offer undergraduate ministry and theology degrees, and by the Province of Alberta as pertains to its authority in the conferring of Bachelor of Arts degrees in selected disciplines.

Ambrose University also has two residence buildings on its campus referred to as Wilson building and the Resident E.D building. Each resident floor has a female and male side referred to as pods, with a shared corridor between them. The female pods are called Julian Hall, Chesley House, Beulah Hall, Reneker Hall, and Pricilla Place. The male pods are called Zion House, Bethel Hall, Lewis Hall, Shalom Hall, and Lighthouse. Each pod has a [resident assistant] (RA) that lives with the residents that they lead that reports to the resident director who works for the Student Life department of Ambrose University. Residents have access to prayer rooms on each floor, two kitchens, two laundry rooms, a media room, squash court,  and basement areas with a piano, foosball, [ping pong], couches, and a designated quiet study area.

Notable persons

 Gordon Skitch, superintendent of the Western Canadian District of The Christian and Missionary Alliance in Canada (C&MA).
 Cecil R. Paul, president of the Eastern Nazarene College (1989-1992) was a notable Canadian Nazarene College alumnus.
 Willis Brooks, pastor of the Regina Alliance Tabernacle and well-known radio pastor.
 George Blackett, the first principal, then president, of the institute. 
 Paul Ens, atheist founder of YouTube channels Paul Ens and Paulogia, attended when he was a Christian.

Notes and references

External links
Official website

 Ambrose University
Universities and colleges in Calgary
Educational institutions established in 1921
Association for Biblical Higher Education
Universities and colleges affiliated with the Christian and Missionary Alliance
1921 establishments in Alberta
Evangelical seminaries and theological colleges in Canada